The Kid from Hell is a 1974 science fiction novel by Arkady and Boris Strugatsky set in the Noon Universe. The English translation was included in a single volume entitled Escape Attempt with the other Noon universe stories Escape Attempt and Space Mowgli.

Plot summary

The novel tells the story of Gack, a teenage boy from Giganda. Gack is a cadet commando in Fighting Cats: an elite army unit of the Alai Duchy. In the first chapter of the novel, Gack is mortally wounded in a dogfight with an attacking tank unit of the army of the Empire. Kornei Yashmaa, a progressor, finds him and takes him to Earth, where the doctors practically resurrect Gack. Yashmaa tries to help Gack adjust to life on Earth.

However, Gack does not want to cooperate, nor does he believe that Earth is real. At first, he thinks that everything Yashmaa and other Earthlings tell him is a part of his psychological training as an officer of the Alai Army. Even after Yashmaa proves to him that he is indeed on a different planet, Gack still thinks that he was sent to Earth with an unknown secret mission by the Alai military.

His next idea is that the Earth wants to conquer Giganda and wants to use him as a test subject or a future propaganda agent. As he learns more about the technology and lifestyle on Earth (he is even given an android servant), he becomes more and more confused. Accidentally, Gack discovers that other Gigandians have been taken to Earth as well, but they have integrated into the society and do not want to deal with him.

After a month since Gack's arrival on Earth, Yashmaa tells him that the war on Giganda was stopped by progressors and that the Alai Duchy as well as the Empire is no more. Gack is shocked by the news so much that he demands to go back to Giganda immediately. When Yashmaa refuses, Gack tries to escape by force. With the help of his android servant, he manages to construct an assault rifle and ammunition to it. Gack threatens to shoot Yashmaa if he does not send him back. Yashmaa can easily disarm Gack, but, persuaded by Gack's actions, decides to let him go.

In the last chapter, Gack is back on Giganda and helps local doctors cure a plague ravaging a nearby city. He is home.

References

1973 science fiction novels
1973 in the Soviet Union
Noon Universe novels
Novels by Arkady and Boris Strugatsky